H1 is an American comic book imprint owned by Humanoids Publishing, which is owned by French publisher Les Humanoïdes Associés.

History
H1 was founded in October 2018 by Kwanza Osajefyo, Carla Speed McNeil and Yanick Paquette as an imprint of Les Humanoïdes Associés. John Cassaday later joined as Chief Creative Officer, while Mark Waid joined as Director of Creative Development.

Crew
Kwanza Osajefyo: co-founder; writer
Carla Speed McNeil: co-founder; writer
Yanick Paquette: co-founder; character designer; cover artist
John Cassaday: Chief Creative Officer
Mark Waid: Director of Creative Development; writer
Fabrice Sapolsky: Senior Editor
Amanda Lucido: Assistant Editor

List of publications

H1 Universe 
 H1 Ignition
 Written by Mark Waid, drawn by Philippe Briones
 One-shot; April 3, 2019 (Free Comic Book Day)
 This one-shot issue starts the H1 franchise, serving as prologue to the series Ignited, Strangelands and Omni. After years of human-made crises around the Earth, the planet itself has decided to respond by causing the "Ignition", which results on many humans around the world receiving their own superpowers, turning them into "Ignited". As a few people want to discover the truth about this phenomenon, a mysterious benefactor plans to recruit them.
 Ignited
 Written by Mark Waid and Kwanza Osajefyo, drawn by Phil Briones
 10 issues; June 5, 2019 – January 20, 2021
 A year after a shooting inside Phoenix Academy High happened during the Ignition, six students turned Ignited join together to prevent another similar crisis in their school.
 Strangelands
 Written by Magdalene Visaggio and Darcie Little Badger, drawn by Guillermo Sanna
 8 issues; July 17, 2019 – August 2, 2020
 A "married couple" is on the run while attempting not to lose control of their powers.
 Omni
 Written by Devin Grayson, drawn by Alitha Martinez
 10 issues; August 14, 2019 – February 4, 2021
 A former physician attempts to deal with her past while trying to discover the secret behind the Ignited.
 Life of an Ignited
 Written by Carla Speed McNeil, drawn by Meredith Laxton
 A bonus story included in the issues of Ignited, Strangelands and Omni, featuring backstories about other people turned into Ignited.

H1 Originals 
 Meyer
 Written by Jonathan "Swifty" Lang, drawn by Andrea Mutti and Shawn Martinbrough
 Graphic novel; September 25, 2019
 Jewish-American mobster Meyer Lansky gets involved with a young janitor for a last job before he gets into retirement.
 The Big Country
 Written by Quinton Peeples, drawn by Dennis Calero
 Graphic novel; November 20, 2019
 Set in 1978, an old-fashioned Sheriff named Grissom Callahan must question his life and methods when a serial killer threatens his town.
 Nicnevin and the Bloody Queen
 Written by Helen Mullane, drawn by Dom Reardon and Matthew Dow Smith
 Graphic novel; March 11, 2020
 The enigmatic Nicnevin Oswald must deal with a series of ghastly murders committed as an attempt to unleash the power of the ancient gods of Great Britain.

References

External links
 Humanoids' official announcement

2019 comics debuts
Les Humanoïdes Associés
Comic book publishing companies of the United States
Publishers of adult comics
Comic book imprints